A Life for a Life is a 1916 drama film directed by Yevgeni Bauer.

Plot 

The film is based on the novel by Georges Ohnet.

Starring 
 Olga Rakhmanova as Mrs. Khromova
 Lidiya Koreneva as Musya Khromova
 Vera Kholodnaya as Nata Khromova
 Vitold Polonsky as Prince Vladimir Bartinsky
 Ivane Perestiani as Zhurov, the merchant

References

External links 
 

1916 films
1910s Russian-language films
Russian silent films
Russian black-and-white films
Russian drama films
1916 drama films
Films of the Russian Empire
Silent drama films
Films based on works by Georges Ohnet